John Whitman may refer to:
 John Whitman (businessman), American businessman and first gentleman of New Jersey
 John Whitman (author), American author and martial arts instructor